Delerue is a surname. Notable people with the surname include:

 Georges Delerue (1925–1992), French composer 
 Henri Delerue (1939–2016), French racewalker